The New Education movement, also known as the New School, éducation nouvelle in French, and Reformpädagogik in German, was an early 20th-century progressive movement within education and the European counterpart to the progressive education movement.

Origins
The New Education movement had its origins within post-First World War society, when a new social order was being constructed. In 1921, the New Education Fellowship was founded, born out of Theosophy and founding the New Education movement. The movement included a number of schools, including the Malting House School, which focused mostly on improving the education experiences of their founders, such as through granting children more educational freedom. The Fellowship had a publication named New Era, which it published until the 1940s, which brought other schools into experimental education. Adherents of the New Education Movement included Maria Montessori, John Dewey, and Jean Piaget.

Theory
The New Education movement preached a theory (here simplified) of acknowledging children's personalities and building a better society. The role of the teacher was not to impose strict regimes on the child, but to nurture the child and help them grow their abilities. It was hoped by members of the New Education movement that a scientific basis could be created on educational problems as a result of the movement building up more interest in experimental psychology. The "scientific educationists", among them educationists such as G. Stanley Hall, believed that study on the "higher faculties" of children would lead to better education. The movement was influenced greatly by Theosophy and Jean-Jacques Rousseau.

References

Citations

General bibliography
 
 
 
 
 
 

Education in Europe
Progressive education